Richard Philip Byrne (born 24 September 1981) is a former Irish footballer who played as left back. He played for clubs including Shamrock Rovers, Dunfermline Athletic and Aberdeen.

Career
Byrne signed for Shamrock Rovers in the summer of 2000 from Stella Maris and made his debut in the Leinster Senior Cup away to St. Francis on 21 November 2000, in a 6–2 win. He was Young Player of the Year for the 2000–01 season. He made his full league debut on 16 September 2001 in a 3–0 win over Shelbourne. He made a total of six appearances in European competition for the Hoops, two in the UEFA Cup and four in the UEFA Intertoto Cup.

He joined Scottish club Dunfermline Athletic in August 2003 and helped the club reach the 2004 Scottish Cup Final, where they were beaten 3–1 by Celtic at Hampden Park. He was signed by former manager at Dunfermline, Jimmy Calderwood for Aberdeen in January 2005 for £50,000. He played in the 2007–08 UEFA Cup against Atlético Madrid. On 15 April 2008, he was told he would not be offered a new contract by Aberdeen and would be free to leave in the summer along with six other players.

After his release, he had trials at Wigan Athletic and N.E.C. Nijmegen. He was given a one-week trial with Oldham Athletic, eventually being given a one-month contract with the club. He was given the number 3 shirt, and made his debut coming on as a substitute in the 3–3 draw with Hartlepool United.

On 14 January 2009, Byrne joined Inverness Caledonian Thistle on a contract until the end of the season. He was then loaned to First Division club St Johnstone. Following Inverness's relegation to the 1st Division Byrne was released as the club began reshaping its squad.

On 1 February 2010, Byrne joined Football League Two side Darlington. He made only two starts and two substitute appearances for the club, and was released before the end of the season.

Byrne signed for Hungerford Town in July 2010.

Byrne signed for Horsham FC in January 2015.

International career
In November 2007, Byrne made his international debut for Republic of Ireland B national team, in a match against Scotland B. Byrne scored Ireland's goal in the 63rd minute, in a 1–1 draw.

Honours
SRFC Young Player of the Year:
 Shamrock Rovers – 2001/02

References

External links
 

Living people
1981 births
Belvedere F.C. players
Stella Maris F.C. players
Shamrock Rovers F.C. players
Dunfermline Athletic F.C. players
Aberdeen F.C. players
Oldham Athletic A.F.C. players
Inverness Caledonian Thistle F.C. players
St Johnstone F.C. players
Darlington F.C. players
Hungerford Town F.C. players
Egham Town F.C. players
Horsham F.C. players
League of Ireland players
Expatriate footballers in England
Expatriate footballers in Scotland
Association footballers from Dublin (city)
Republic of Ireland association footballers
Republic of Ireland B international footballers
Republic of Ireland under-21 international footballers
Republic of Ireland expatriate association footballers
Scottish Football League players
Scottish Premier League players
English Football League players
Association football fullbacks